Božo Koprivica is an essayist, dramatic adviser and literary critic from Montenegro, of Yugoslavian ethnicity.

He is best known for his books Volej i sluh (from 1992) and Kiš, Borhes i Maradona (from 1996), which reached cult status. Koprivica lives and works in Belgrade, the capital city of Serbia. He has been a good friend of the eminent Yugoslav novelist and short story writer Danilo Kiš.

Books
Volej i sluh (1992)
Kiš, Borhes i Maradona (1996)
Dribling (2006)
Samo bogovi mogu obećati (2010)
San ulice (2018)
Vježbanka Danilo Kiš (2019)
Ludjak je vječito dijete (2020)

References

1950 births
Living people
Yugoslav writers
Writers from Nikšić
Writers from Belgrade
University of Belgrade Faculty of Philology alumni